Matošević is a gender-neutral Croatian surname. Notable people with the surname include:

Ivan Matošević (born 1989), Croatian football player
Marinko Matosevic (born 1985), Australian tennis player
Matea Matošević (born 1989), Croatian long-distance runner 
Valter Matošević (born 1970), Croatian handball player
Vedran Matošević (born 1990), Croatian futsal player 

Croatian surnames
Patronymic surnames